Berezovo is a rural locality (a selo) in Soloneshensky District, Altai Krai, Russia. The population was 45 as of 2013. There are 2 streets.

Geography 
Berezovo is located 45 km north of Soloneshnoye (the district's administrative centre) by road. Kamyshenka is the nearest rural locality.

References 

Rural localities in Soloneshensky District